Stephen Argüelles Clarke (born 16 November 1963) is an English jazz drummer, producer and is the proprietor of the Plush record label. He has also worked in film and theatre. He is the elder brother of saxophonist Julian Argüelles. Stephen currently lives in Paris, France.

Life and career
Argüelles was born in Crowborough, East Sussex and raised in Birmingham. From the age of 16, when he became the house drummer at Ronnie Scott's, through his seminal work as a founder of the 1980s group Loose Tubes, and his work with Django Bates in the early Human Chain, he has shown an innovation beyond the usual role of the drummer.

Argüelles has collaborated with folk singer Corin Curschellas and John Wolf Brennan of Switzerland and with Nguyên Lê. He also plays in a trio with Benoît Delbecq and Noël Akchoté : The Recyclers. With Benoit Delbecq and electric bassist Christophe Minck, he also played with the French male pop singer Katerine on two albums; Les Créatures (1999) and Huitième Ciel (2002), and a lot of concerts in Europe.

Selected discography
 1990 – Steve Argüelles
 1994 – Busy Listening
 1994 – Blue Moon in a Function Room
 1997 – Recyclers – Circuit
 1998 – Circuit
 1998 – Indigo, Ig Henneman Tentet with Tristan Honsinger, Ab Baars, Theo Jörgensmann, a.o. 
 2004 – We da man!, Ambitronix (with Benoit Delbecq)
 2005 – I.N.I.T.I.A.L..S. with John Wolf Brennan, Christy Doran and Urs Leimgruber

References

1963 births
English jazz drummers
British male drummers
Living people
People from Crowborough
British male jazz musicians
Loose Tubes members
Human Chain members
Voice of God Collective members